Bathnaha may refer to:

 THE AARAV SONI
 Bathnaha, Janakpur, Nepal
 Bathnaha, Sagarmatha, Nepal
 Bathnaha, Araria, a village in Araria district, Bihar, India
 Bathnaha, Sitamarhi, Sitamarhi district, Bihar
 Bathnaha (Vidhan Sabha constituency), Sitamarhi district, Bihar